Ravi Bhatia is an Indian television actor. He is known for his portrayal of Salim in Zee TV's Jodha Akbar.

Career 
He started with small roles in Dharamveer, Hamaaray Mahaabhaarat Ki, Veekram and Betaal. In Dharamveer as a debutant, Bhatia played the supporting role of Kranti. He was a contestant on the show Dadagiri, where he was slapped by a female participant and responded by slapping her. The two were separated by several crew members, who also physically assaulted Bhatia on video. The incident resulted in his exclamations of  "How can she slap?" becoming a meme. He later played the role of Salim in TV series Jodha Akbar and then played a supporting role in Star Plus show Raja Ki Aayegi Baraat, and later played the lead role in Sahara One's Hamaari Beti Raaj Karegi. 
In 2013, he was seen as Vivek in Zee TV’s Do Dil Bandhe Ek Dori Se.

In 2014, he was selected out of 12 contestants for the role of Prince Salim in Ekta Kapoor's popular historical show Jodha Akbar. In 2015, he started appearing on various Indonesian television shows. In 2019 he played the lead episodic role of Bakul in &TV's Laal Ishq opposite Neha Pednaker.

Filmography

Films

Television

Web series 

 Shukla – The Tiger (as Shukla)
 Halala (as Rahil)
 Margaon – The Closed File (Upcoming)
 Char ka Punchnama (Upcoming) 
 Hastinapur (Upcoming)

Music videos

References

External links

1988 births
Living people
Indian male television actors
Participants in Indian reality television series
Male actors from Himachal Pradesh
People from Mandi, Himachal Pradesh